Communauté d'agglomération du Grand Nord de Mayotte is a communauté d'agglomération, an intercommunal structure in the Mayotte overseas department and region of France. Created in 2015, its seat is in Bandraboua. Its area is 87.2 km2. Its population was 60,372 in 2019.

Composition
The communauté d'agglomération consists of the following 4 communes:
Acoua
Bandraboua
Koungou
Mtsamboro

References

Grand Nord de Mayotte
Grand Nord de Mayotte